The Sierra Club Foundation is an American nonprofit charitable organization focused on environmental efforts. It is the independent fiscal sponsor of the charitable programs of the Sierra Club, a 501(c)(4) social welfare organization. The organization's stated mission is to "help educate, inspire, and empower humanity to preserve the natural and human environment." Based in Oakland, California and founded in 1960, the Sierra Club Foundation funds a range of environmental projects. Members of the organization's board of directors have included Lynn Jurich and Mike Richter. The current board of directors include Darren Aronofsky, Steven Berkenfield, Marni McKinnney, Doug Walker and Sanjay Ranchod.

See also

Sustainability
Biodiversity
Global warming
Ecology
Ecosystem
Earth Science
Natural environment
Nature
Conservation Movement
Conservation ethic

References

External links
The Sierra Club Foundation - Official website
The Sierra Club - Official website

Sierra Club
Conservation and environmental foundations in the United States
Organizations established in 1960